The Danish Union of Professional Technicians (Danish: Teknisk Landsforbund, TL) is a trade union in Denmark. It is an affiliate of the Danish Confederation of Trade Unions.

History
The Danish Union of Professional Technicians was founded in 1919. It became a member of LO in 1994.

Location
The Danish Union of Professional Technicians is based in Teknikernes Hus ("The Technicians' House") at Nørre Voldgade 12 in central Copenhagen. The building is the former headquarters of Kastrup Glasværk. It is from 1892 and was designed by the architect Philip Smidth.

References

External links
 Official site

Danish Confederation of Trade Unions
Trade unions in Denmark
1919 establishments in Denmark